Frank Wolfe may refer to:
Frank Delos Wolfe (1863–1926), architect in California
Frank Wolfe (before 1868–after 1906), English footballer in 1886–87 Royal Arsenal F.C. season
Frank Wolfe (fictional character), see List of American Pickers episodes

See also
Frank–Wolfe algorithm, an optimization algorithm
Frank Wolf (disambiguation)
Frank Wolff (disambiguation)
Francis Wolfe (disambiguation)
Wolfe (surname)